2AD is an Australian radio station serving the Armidale region. It was opened in February 1936.

References

External links
Official web site
Official web site

Radio stations in New South Wales
Radio stations established in 1936
News and talk radio stations in Australia
Classic hits radio stations in Australia
Broadcast Operations Group